Lake Marvin is a reservoir in Floyd County, in the U.S. state of Georgia. The lake was named for Marvin Muze, the original landowner.

Description
Lake Marvin is located in northern Floyd County in a basin known as The Pocket. The lake is situated between Horn Mountain and Mill Mountain, two ridges in the Ridge-and-Valley Appalachians. The lake is surrounded by the Johns Mountain Wildlife Management Area and the Chattahoochee-Oconee National Forest.

The reservoir was created by the completion of Lake Marvin Dam on Pocket Creek. The Northwest Georgia Girl Scout Council owns the reservoir.

The lake is home to redear sunfish, bluegill, and largemouth bass.

Lake Marvin was not open to the public during the COVID-19 pandemic.

See also
List of lakes in Georgia (U.S. state)
Pocket Creek
The Pocket (Floyd County, Georgia)

References

Bodies of water of Floyd County, Georgia
Marvin
Chattahoochee-Oconee National Forest